A list of films produced by the Bollywood film industry based in Mumbai in 1975

Top-grossing films
The most popular and successful films of 1978 are: Main Tulsi Tere Aangan Ki, Satyam Shivam Sundaram, Ankhiyon Ke Jharokhon Se, Muqaddar Ka Sikandar, and Don. 

The top ten grossing films (without adjusting inflation) at the Indian Box Office in 1978 are:

1978

References

External links
 Bollywood films of 1978 at the Internet Movie Database

1978
Lists of 1978 films by country or language
Films, Bollywood